Hervé Duclos-Lassalle (born 24 December 1979 in Pau) is a French professional road bicycle racer. His father is Gilbert Duclos-Lassalle. He was the first rider to leave the 2008 Tour de France after breaking his left wrist on the first stage.

Career highlights

Major results

2003
 1st Overall Tour du Loir-et-Cher
2004
 1st Stage 5a Vuelta Ciclista a Navarra
2008
 1st Grand Prix d'Ouverture La Marseillaise
 11th Gent–Wevelgem

Grand Tour general classification results timeline

External links 
Profile at Cofidis official website 

French male cyclists
1979 births
Living people
Sportspeople from Pau, Pyrénées-Atlantiques
Cyclists from Nouvelle-Aquitaine